Guoan means national security in Chinese (the word itself was a combination of two words: country and safety/peace), may refer to company related to CITIC Guoan Group:
Beijing Guoan F.C.,  Chinese Super League football team founded by CITIC Guoan Group, now owned by Sinobo Group
Beijing Guoan (Superleague Formula team),  racing team of Beijing Guoan F.C., competing in the Superleague Formula
CITIC Guoan Information Industry, Chinese enterprise in the computer network infrastructure and information service industries